The Mall at Tuttle Crossing is an enclosed shopping mall located in northwest Columbus, Ohio. It has a Dublin, Ohio mailing address, but it is in the Columbus city limits. It was developed by a joint venture of Taubman Centers and the Georgetown Company and opened on July 24, 1997. In 2021, the mall was reported to be heading towards foreclosure. The anchor stores are Macy's, Scene75 Entertainment Center, and JCPenney. There is one vacant store that was once Sears.

History 
The mall opened on July 11, 1997 with Sears, Lazarus, Marshall Field's, and JCPenney as anchor stores.

In 2003, Lazarus was turned into Lazarus-Macy's, and the original Marshall Field's became Kaufmann's in February 2003. Lazarus-Macy’s became Macy’s in March 2005. In 2006, due to the Federated-May merger, the Kaufmann's store was renamed Macy's at Hayden Run.

As of October 2006 there are two Macy's located at the mall, Macy's at Tuttle Crossing (the original Lazarus store) and Macy's at Hayden Run (the former Marshall Field's/Kaufmann's) until March 2017.

On January 4, 2017, Macy's announced it would be closing the Macy's at Hayden Run sometime during the same year.

In early summer 2018, Scene75 Entertainment purchased the former Marshall Field's/Kaufmann's/Macy's building and tract. Soon after Scene75 on October 11, 2019 they were open to the public.

On December 28, 2018, it was announced that Sears would also be closing as part of a plan to close 80 stores nationwide. The store closed in March 2019.

The Mall portion has had three owners during its history (both prior owners were purchased by Simon):
Taubman Centers from its opening in 1997 until 2003
The Mills Corporation from 2003 until 2007
Simon Property Group, which owned 50%, and managed by Simon from April 2007 to until 2020
 after 2020 the mall was placed into Receivership by the courts.  

The Woodmont Company, is the current management company for the Receiver from 2020 to the present.

Description and location 
The mall itself anchors an economically strong and growing area of office complexes, restaurants, apartments and condominiums surrounding the interchange of I-270 and Tuttle Crossing Boulevard. The area is a good example of the suburban phenomenon known as an edge city.

Current anchors 
JCPenney (opened in 1997)
Macy's at Tuttle Crossing (opened in 2006)
Scene75 Entertainment (opened in 2019)

Former anchors 
Lazarus (opened in 1997, renamed in 2005 to Macy's (at Tuttle Crossing)) 
Marshall Field's (opened in 1997, became Kaufmann's in 2003, then became Macy's (at Hayden Run) in 2006, closed in 2017, became Scene75 in 2019) 
Sears (opened in 1997, closed in 2019, now vacant)

References

External links

Shopping malls in Columbus, Ohio
Shopping malls established in 1997
1997 establishments in Ohio